Innlandet Hospital is a health trust which covers the counties of Hedmark and Oppland of Norway. The health trust consists of 10 divisions with services over 41 sites in Hedmark and Oppland. The hospital's institution lies in Brumunddal, in Ringsaker municipality, north of Hamar. It is owned by Southern and Eastern Norway Regional Health Authority.

Hospital structure 
Innlandet Hospital consists of six somatic hospitals, which first and foremost deal with physical ailments, and two psychiatric hospitals which deal with various mental disorders.

Across these hospitals, the decentralised services of both mental and somatic illnesses can be found.

Divisions
 Hospital divisions
 Elverum-Hamar
 Gjøvik
 Lillehammer
 Kongsvinger
 Tynset
 Subject divisions
 Acute medicine and pre-hospital Services Division 
 Habilitation and Rehabilitation Division 
 Medical Services Division
 Psychiatric Health Services Division
 Non-medical Divisions
 Ownership and Intern Service Division

Hospitals 

 Somatic hospitals
 Elverum Hospital
 Gjøvik Hospital
 Granheim Lung Hospital
 Hamar Hospital
 Kongsvinger Hospital
 Lillehammer Hospital
 Tynset Hospital
 Psychiatric hospitals
 Reinsvoll Hospital 
 Sanderud Hospital

Staff Health 

The staff of the vice-administrative director is known as Staff Health. In this staff, are IT services, electronic patient journals, research departments and knowledge centres. In Avdeling for kunnskapsstøtte there are also library services, and courses for practical knowledge, knowledge courses, structured learning plans, and clinical pathways.

External links 
 Innlandet Hospital
 Innlandet Hospital Library

Health trusts of Norway